Minimal may refer to:
 Minimal (music genre), art music that employs limited or minimal musical materials
 "Minimal" (song), 2006 song by Pet Shop Boys
 Minimal (supermarket) or miniMAL, a former supermarket chain in Germany and Poland
 Minimal (Dungeons & Dragons), a creature of magically reduced size in the game Dungeons & Dragons
 Minimal (chocolate), a bean to bar chocolate store in Japan, featured in Kantaro: The Sweet Tooth Salaryman
 Minimal (clothing), an Indonesia clothing-retail company that worked with fashion model Ayu Gani

See also

Minimalism (disambiguation)
Maximal (disambiguation)
Minimisation (disambiguation)
Minimal prime (disambiguation)